Theresa Bernice Bubbear  is a British diplomat and has been the British Ambassador to the Finland since August 2021. She was previously the British Ambassador to Estonia between 2016 and 2021.

Personal life

Bubbear was born in central London and studied at a school in Blackheath. She then went on to read French and Russian at Girton College, Cambridge.

She is married to a fellow diplomat who she met whilst living in Moscow, they have three daughters. She speaks English, French, Russian, Finnish and Spanish.

Career

Bubbear joined the Civil Service in 1985, working for the Foreign and Commonwealth Office and has been placed in Moscow, Helsinki and South Africa. Bubbear acted as the British Ambassador to Estonia between September 2016 and July 2021, before entering her current role as the British Ambassador to Finland. She previously held the positions of Chargé d'Affaires and Deputy Head of Mission at the British Embassy in Budapest from August 2011 to April 2016.

She was appointed Officer of the Order of the British Empire (OBE) in the 2021 Birthday Honours for services to British foreign policy.

References

British women ambassadors
Ambassadors of the United Kingdom to Estonia
Ambassadors of the United Kingdom to Finland
Diplomats from London
Alumni of Girton College, Cambridge
Living people
Year of birth missing (living people)
Officers of the Order of the British Empire